Halal in the Family (also known as The Qu'osby Show) is a four-episode American web series starring Aasif Mandvi and Sakina Jaffrey. It premiered on Funny or Die featuring an American Muslim family and addressing the underlying issues of Islamophobia in a comedic context. It uses the classic family sitcom formula to change perceptions of Muslims. Mandvi stated in the fifth episode of season two of Politically Re-Active that Halal in the Family is being developed as an animated series for TBS.

Cast

Main cast
Aasif Mandvi as Aasif Qu'osby
Sakina Jaffrey as Fatima Qu'osby
Shoba Narayan as Whitney Qu’osby
Nicky Maindiratta as Bobby Qu’osby

Supporting cast
Tariq Trotter as Cousin Tariq
Samantha Bee as Wendy
Jordan Klepper as Waleed
Russ Armstrong as Mr. Smith
Jason Babinsky as Protestor
Morgan Turner as Jessica

Episodes

 "Spies Like Us"
 "A Very Spooq'y Halloween Special"
 "B'ully"
 "The Amazing Race"

Reception

Awards
2016 Peabody-Facebook Futures of Media Award

References

External links 
 
 

2015 web series endings